Michael Palaiologos (died 1156) was an early member of the great family of the Palaiologoi, which later ruled the Byzantine Empire. He was a general of the emperor Manuel I Komnenos (1143–1180).

In 1150, he was sent to raise an army among the people of the region of Ancona for an attempt at resurrecting the old theme of Langobardia. In Spring 1155, Count Robert III of Loritello, a rebel against the king of Sicily, William the Bad, negotiated support from Manuel. With an army of Anconans, Palaiologos and John Doukas descended the Italian peninsula into Apulia. Vieste was the first city to fall, but important Trani resisted surrender until Bari was bribed to open the gates of its citadel a week later. Then, not only Trani, but Giovinazzo and Ruvo surrendered to the Byzantine forces. Richard, Count of Andria, was killed in battle and Andria too submitted. The imperial army moved on to besiege Bosco, where it defeated a royal army. Montepeloso, Gravina, and fifty hamlets surrendered and Monopoli signed a truce. It was then, at the height of the campaign, that Palaiologos died at Bari.

Byzantine generals
12th-century Byzantine people
Michael
1156 deaths
Year of birth unknown
Generals of Manuel I Komnenos